Clauson is a surname of Germanic origin. The name refers to:
Bryan Clauson (1989–2016), American race car driver
Clinton Clauson (1895–1959), American politician; governor of Maine 1959
Gerard Clauson (1891–1974), English Orientalist
Hailey Clauson (b. 1995), American fashion model
William Clauson (1930–2017), Swedish-American folk singer